Thiri Pyanchi Yin May FRCS FRCP FRCOG (September 190029 September 1978) was a Burmese physician and educator. She was the first Burmese obstetrician and gynecologist, and the first person to perform the Caesarian section in British Burma. She is also known for her research on amoebic vaginitis, known as May's disease.

Yin May founded the country's main maternity hospital during the Japanese occupation (1942–1945), and she co-founded the wartime medical and nursing schools (1943–1945). After the war, she served as the head of Lady Dufferin Maternity Hospital from 1946 to 1959, and the head of the Department of Obstetrics and Gynecology of the Faculty of Medicine of Rangoon University from 1947 to 1959. Under her leadership, Dufferin became a maternity hospital recognized by the Royal College of Obstetricians and Gynaecologists in 1957.

Early life and education
Yin May was born in September 1900 to a well-to-do family in Prome (Pyay) in British Burma. (Her father U Kyaw was then the Deputy Commissioner of Prome, a mid-level official in the colonial administration, and later became the Secretary of Home and Defence by the early 1940s.) She had at least one brother, Thein Kyaw.

Yin May had a brilliant academic career. After two years at Rangoon College, she went to study medicine at the University of Calcutta on a scholarship in 1919, and graduated with an MB (and a gold medal in pathology) in 1925. She then spent a year at Rangoon General Hospital as a staff physician before leaving for the UK for graduate studies in obstetrics and gynecology in 1926. In 1927, she received her LRCP and MRCS certifications from the Royal College of Physicians of England and the Royal College of Surgeons of England, respectively. After two more years of training, she received her FRCS fellowship (specializing in gynecology) from the Royal College of Surgeons of Edinburgh in 1929, becoming the second Burmese woman FRCS in history. She returned to Rangoon in 1930, after stints in Dublin (1929) and Vienna (1930).

Career

Pre-WWII
Back in Rangoon, Yin May started as the Assistant Medical Superintendent of Lady Dufferin Maternity Hospital in 1930. As the deputy head of a major hospital, she had joined the upper echelons of the tiny colonial era medical community made up mainly of foreign-born physicians and specialists that existed primarily in Rangoon (Yangon). (Her two superiors during her first stay at the hospital (1930–1936) were British IMS officers: Lt. Col. S.T. Crump (1930–1931) and Lt. Col. M.L. Treston (1931–1936).)

Yin May was instrumental in the expansion of modern obstetrics and gynecology (OG/OBGYN) practices in Burma; she was the first person to perform the Caesarian section in the country. She started an OG program at Rangoon Medical College that finally yielded the country's first ever MBBS graduates specializing in OG, and founded the first OG training school for midwives that taught primarily in Burmese in 1937. All the while, she contributed to the field. In 1937, she published her most famous research paper in The Indian Medical Gazette on amoebic vaginitis, which was subsequently named May's disease.

WWII

Yin May founded and ran the country's main maternity hospital during World War II (1942–1945). It was out of sheer necessity. The country had been without its main maternity hospital since 25 December 1941 when Japanese aerial bombing destroyed Dufferin Hospital. Patients from Dufferin were moved to Rangoon General Hospital but the Imperial Japanese Army seized the general hospital for its exclusive use in March 1942, leaving the non-Japanese without a hospital. Most of its tiny colonial era medical staff had also fled. Indeed, she herself fled with her husband Min Sein and their young son to Upper Burma in early 1942. But she somehow got separated from her family in Upper Burma, and returned to Rangoon  mid 1942 alone, and pregnant. She then joined BIA Hospital, the makeshift hospital founded by Dr. Ba Than, as the head of the Maternity Unit.

It would prove to be her biggest challenge yet. In the beginning, she had no staff with any OG experience; she was assigned just one novice physician Kyee Paw and a few nurses. According to Myint Swe, a pregnant Yin May, despite getting tired easily, worked all hours at the hospital; she even went back to work the night after she had given birth herself to perform a complicated surgery to save a mother's life. In late 1942, she was able to establish a maternity hospital in Tamwe Township. Dr. Kyee Paw, who would later become a highly accomplished surgeon and professor in his own right, joined as her deputy. The maternity hospital proved a lifeline to many would-be mothers, and became a training ground for a new generation of several young physicians and nurses. She, along with Drs. Ba Than and S. Sen, was a co-founder of the wartime medical and nursing schools. The trio oversaw the programs, and graded exam papers.

Post-WWII

After the war, she continued her roles as the foremost OG practitioner and educator in the country. She served as the head of the reconstructed Dufferin Hospital from 1946 to 1959, and also as the head of the Department of Obstetrics and Gynecology of the Faculty of Medicine of Rangoon University from 1947 to 1959. Between 1946 and 1948, she as the head (Medical Superintendent) of Dufferin also became a Lt. Col. in Burma Medical Service in the colonial administration called Civil Affairs Service, Burma (CAS-B). She was responsible for getting Dufferin Hospital to be recognized as a teaching hospital by the Royal College of Obstetricians and Gynaecologists in 1957. Having a local RCOG recognized hospital made it much easier for Burmese OGs to pursue FRCOG fellowships. Through the process, Yin May too became an FRCOG in 1957. It was her third fellowship; she became an FRCP from Royal College of Physicians, Edinburgh in 1954. She was the first Burmese to achieve a fellowship in three different disciplines, and is recognized as one of the pioneers of modern medicine in Myanmar.

Prof. Yin May retired in 1959 but remained active. She was a member of the executive committee of Burma Research Society. She died on 29 September 1978 in Rangoon. Her husband Min Sein died six weeks later on 9 November 1978. For her services to the country, she was awarded the title of Thiri Pyanchi in 1949.

Personal life
Yin May married Dr. Min Sein, then a captain in the IMS, in 1936. Min Sein went on to become a lieutenant colonel in the BMS (the Burmese version of IMS) by 1946, the first Burmese dean of the Faculty of Medicine of Rangoon University in 1947. He served in the British 14th Army from 1942 to 1946. The couple had a son and a daughter, including Dr. Thein Htut, a gastroenterologist, as well as an adopted son, Brig. Gen. Dr. Mya Thein Han, who went on to become the director of Myanmar Army Medical Corps.

Notes

References

Bibliography
 
 
 
 
 
 
 
 
 
 
 
 
 
 
 
 

Burmese obstetricians
20th-century Burmese physicians
People from Bago Region
1900 births
1978 deaths
Fellows of the Royal College of Surgeons of Edinburgh
Fellows of the Royal College of Physicians of Edinburgh
Fellows of the Royal College of Obstetricians and Gynaecologists
Burmese women physicians
Recipients of the Thiri Pyanchi
Burmese gynaecologists